Leandro Enrique Díaz Parra (born 16 March 1999) is a Chilean professional footballer who plays as a left-back for Chilean club Unión La Calera.

References

External links
 

1999 births
Living people
People from Curicó
Chilean footballers
Chilean Primera División players
Segunda División Profesional de Chile players
Universidad de Concepción footballers
Deportes La Serena footballers
Association football defenders